Carbacanthographis acanthoamicta is a species of corticolous (bark-dwelling) lichen in the family Graphidaceae. Found in Papua New Guinea, it was formally described as a new species in 2022 by Shirley Cunha Feuerstein and Robert Lücking. It is only known to occur at the type locality. The lichen has an olive to yellowish brown thallus with a thin cortex and an underlying prothallus. Its ascospores number 8 per ascus, are hyaline and measure 17–20 by 8 μm; they have from 7 to seven transverse septa and from 0 to two longitudinal septa. Carbacanthographis acanthoamicta contains salazinic acid, a lichen product than can be detected using thin-layer chromatography. The specific epithet alludes to its similarity with Carbacanthographis amicta.

References

acanthoamicta
Lichen species
Lichens described in 2022
Taxa named by Robert Lücking
Lichens of New Guinea